Lepechinia is a genus of plants in the mint family, Lamiaceae. It includes several species of plants known commonly as pitchersages (also pitcher sages). Plants of this genus can be found in Central and South America, Mexico, California, Hispaniola, and Hawaii, although the species in Hawaii is probably a human introduction. Many of them bear attractive pitcher-shaped flowers, often in shades of purple. The genus was named for the Russian botanist Ivan Ivanovich Lepechin. Recently, the two monotypic genera Chaunostoma and Neoeplingia were shown to be part of Lepechinia.

Species
 Lepechinia anomala Epling - southern Brazil
 Lepechinia bella Epling - Bolivia
 Lepechinia betonicaefolia  (Lam.) Epling - Colombia, Ecuador
 Lepechinia bullata  (Kunth) Epling - Colombia, Ecuador, Venezuela
 Lepechinia calycina (Benth.) Epling ex Munz – pitcher sage, woodbalm - California (Coast Ranges + northern Sierra Nevada)
 Lepechinia cardiophylla Epling – Santa Ana pitcher sage - southern California, Baja California
 Lepechinia caulescens (Ortega) Epling - Mexico, Guatemala
 Lepechinia chamaedryoides (Balb.) Epling - Chile
 Lepechinia cocuyensis J.R.I.Wood - Colombia
 Lepechinia codon Epling - Peru
 Lepechinia conferta (Benth.) Epling - Colombia, Venezuela
 Lepechinia dioica J.A.Hart - Ecuador
 Lepechinia flammea Mart.Gord. & Lozada-Pérez - Guerrero
 Lepechinia floribunda (Benth.) Epling - Peru, Bolivia, Argentina
 Lepechinia fragrans (Greene) Epling – island pitcher sage, fragrant pitcher sage - southern California including offshore Channel Islands
 Lepechinia ganderi Epling – San Diego pitcher sage - southern California, Baja California
 Lepechinia glomerata Epling - Jalisco
 Lepechinia hastata (A.Gray) Epling – pakata - Baja California and Baja California Sur, including Revillagigedo Islands; naturalized in Hawaii
 Lepechinia heteromorpha  (Briq.) Epling - Ecuador, Peru, Bolivia
 Lepechinia lamiifolia (Benth.) Epling - Ecuador, Peru
 Lepechinia lancifolia (Rusby) Epling - Bolivia
 Lepechinia leucophylloides (Ramamoorthy, Hiriart & Medrano) B.T.Drew, Cacho & Sytsma - Hidalgo
 Lepechinia marica Epling & Mathias - Peru
 Lepechinia mecistandra (Donn.Sm.) H.K.Moon - Chiapas, Guatemala, El Salvador
 Lepechinia mexicana (S.Schauer) Epling - central + northeastern Mexico
 Lepechinia meyenii (Walp.) Epling - Peru, Bolivia, Argentina
 Lepechinia mollis (Epling) Epling - Peru
 Lepechinia mutica (Benth.) Epling - Ecuador
 Lepechinia nelsonii (Fernald) Epling - central + southern Mexico
 Lepechinia paniculata (Kunth) Epling - Ecuador
 Lepechinia radula (Benth.) Epling - Ecuador, Peru
 Lepechinia rossii S.Boyd & Mistretta – Ross' pitcher sage - southern California (Los Angeles + Ventura Counties) 
 Lepechinia rufocampii Epling & Mathias - Ecuador
 Lepechinia salviae (Lindl.) Epling - Chile
 Lepechinia salviifolia (Kunth) Epling - Colombia, Venezuela
 Lepechinia schiedeana (Schltdl.) Vatke - Mexico, Guatemala, Costa Rica, Panama, Colombia, Venezuela
 Lepechinia scobina Epling - Peru
 Lepechinia speciosa  (A.St.-Hil. ex Benth.) Epling - southern Brazil
 Lepechinia tomentosa (Benth.) Epling - Peru
 Lepechinia urbani (Briq.) Epling - Hispaniola
 Lepechinia velutina J.R.I.Wood - Colombia
 Lepechinia vesiculosa (Benth.) Epling - Peru, Bolivia, Argentina
 Lepechinia vulcanicola J.R.I.Wood - Colombia
 Lepechinia yecorana'' Henrickson, Fishbein & T.Van Devender - Sonora

References

External links

USDA Plants Profile: Lepechinia

 
Lamiaceae genera
Plants described in 1804
Flora of Central America
Flora of South America
Flora of Mexico
Flora of California